Walshaw is a village forming part of the Metropolitan Borough of Bury, in Greater Manchester, England. It is to the south of Tottington and 2 miles northwest of Bury.

The village has a school, several pubs and a restaurant. It lies around the top of Walshaw Road and the memorial cross and three radiating streets slightly to the North. One third of the centre of the village is taken up by Christ Church Primary School, which is linked to Christ Church on High Street.

References

Villages in Greater Manchester
Geography of the Metropolitan Borough of Bury